We're Down Til We're Underground is the second studio album by the American hardcore band Give Up the Ghost. The album was released on September 23, 2003 through Equal Vision Records. We're Down Til We're Underground was later reissued in 2011 through Deathwish Inc. to coincide with the band's reunion shows.

Track listing
 "(It's Sometimes Like It Never Started)" – 0:58
 "Love American" – 2:14
 "Young Hearts Be Free Tonight" – 1:43
 "Since Always" – 2:23
 "Calculation-Nation" – 0:57
 "The Last Supper After Party" – 2:37
 "Crime Scene" – 2:33
 "Bluem" – 3:24
 "AEIOU" – 2:50
 "Crush of the Year" – 2:04
 "No Lotion Could Ever Unclog These Pores" – 1:11
 "We Killed It" – 3:15
 "(And It's Sometimes Like It Will Never End)" – 5:11

References

Equal Vision Records albums
Deathwish Inc. albums
2003 albums